Shigeo Sasaki (18 November 1912 Yamagata Prefecture, Japan – 14 August 1987 Tokyo) was a Japanese mathematician working on differential geometry who introduced Sasaki manifolds. He retired from Tohoku University's Mathematical Institute in April 1976.

Publications

References

20th-century Japanese mathematicians
1912 births
1987 deaths